Ketevan is a Georgian feminine given name. It is sometimes used as a Georgian form of Katherine but, in terms of their etymology, the two names aren't related as Katherine has origins in the Greek language while Ketevan has origins in the Georgian language. Diminutives of Ketevan include Kato, Keti, Keta, Ketato, Keto and Ketino, with Keti popular in English-speaking populations, likely due to its pronunciation and spelling being similar to Katie, and Kato and Keto popular among Georgians in Russia. The name was in common use for Georgian royalty and batonishvili.

Forms 

 Ketevan (Georgian)
 Kéthévane, Kethevan, Kethevane, Khétévane (French)
 Ketewan (German)

People

Academics 

 Ketevan Lomtatidze (1911–2007), Georgian caucasologist

Arts and entertainment 

 Ketevan "Keti" Khitiri (born 1982), Georgian actress
 Ketevan Magalashvili (1894-1973), Georgian painter
 Ketevan "Katie" Melua (born 1984), Georgian-born British singer-songwriter
 Ketevan "Keti" Topuria (born 1986), Georgian singer

Athletics and competition 

 Elizabeth Stone (nee Ketevan Khurtsidze; born 1990), Georgian-born American swimmer and Paralympic medalist
 Ketevan Arakhamia-Grant (born 1968), Soviet-born Georgian chess grandmaster
 Ketevan "Keto" Losaberidze (born 1949), Georgian-born Soviet archer and Olympic gold medalist
 Ketevan Arbolishvili (born 2003), Georgian rhythmic gymnast

Politics 

 Ketevan Tsikhelashvili (born 1978), Georgian politician

Royalty and nobility 

 Ketevan the Martyr (c. 1560–1624), member of the House of Mukhrani and wife of King David I of Kakheti
 Ketevan of Kakheti (1648–1719), member of the Bagrationi dynasty and wife of King Bagrat IV of Imereti and King Archil of Imereti
 Ketevan of Kakheti (fl. 1737), member of the Bagrationi dynasty and wife of Adil Shah of Persia
 Ketevan of Georgia (1764–1840), member of the Bagrationi dynasty and wife of Prince Ioane of Mukhrani
 Ketevan Andronikashvili (1754–1782), member of the Andronikashvili family and wife of King George XII of Kartli and Kakheti
 Khétévane Bagration de Moukhrani (born 1954), French-born member of the House of Mukhrani and Georgian diplomat
 Ketevan "Keto" Mikeladze (1905–1965), member of Mikeladze family and fashion designer
 Ketevan Pkheidze (d. 1744), member of the Mkheidze family and wife of King Heraclius II of Kartli and Kakheti
 Ketevan Orbeliani (d. 1750), member of the House of Orbeliani

Other figures 

 Ketevan "Kato" Svanidze (1885–1907), Russian-born Georgian wife of Joseph Stalin

Other uses 

 Ketevan, album by Katie Melua, released in 2013
 Ketevan Barateli, character in Repentance

Georgian feminine given names